Tollcross station was a railway station in the east end of Glasgow, Scotland. It was opened by the Caledonian Railway as Tollcross on 1 February 1897.

Located next to the settlements of Braidfauld and Auchenshuggle between the London Road and Tollcross Road arterial routes, it was closed to passengers on 5 October 1964. The lines have also been removed, but the land has not been built upon into the 21st century.

References

Sources

External links
Tollcross at RAILSCOT 

Disused railway stations in Glasgow
Beeching closures in Scotland
Railway stations in Great Britain opened in 1897
Railway stations in Great Britain closed in 1964
Former Caledonian Railway stations
1897 establishments in Scotland
1964 disestablishments in Scotland